Sohini is a raga in Hindustani classical music in the Marwa thaat. Alternate transliterations include Sohani and Sohni. Like Bahar, it is a small raga, with not much space for elaboration. It emotes the feel of longing, of passive sensuousness.

Technical Description

The raga is of audav-shadav nature, i.e., it has five swaras (notes) in the arohana (ascent) and six in the avarohana. Pancham (Pa) is not used.

The vadi swara is Dha, and samvadi is Ga.
The rishabh is weak, but Gandhar (Ga) is strong, unlike Marwa. It is an Uttaranga pradhan raga, with the higher notes on the saptak (octave) being used more frequently.

Samay (Time)
Raga Sohini is associated with very late night / pre-dawn, the last or eighth period of day, roughly from 3-6AM.
(3 AM - 6 AM) : 4th Prahar of the Night : Sandhi-Prakash Raag

Film Songs

Language:Tamil 
Note that these are composed in the Carnatic ragam Hamsanandi, which Sohni sounds similar to.

Further information
It is somewhat similar to Marwa and Puriya ragas in the same thaat, and also to Basant in the Poorvi thaat.

References

Hindustani ragas